Bomraspeta is a Mandal in Vikarabad district, Telangana.

Institutions
 Zilla Parishad High School

Villages
The villages in Bomraspeta mandal include:
 Amsanpalle 	
 Bapally Tanda 	
 Bomraspeta 	
 Burhanpur 	
 Chilmalmailwar 	
 Chowdapalle 	
 Dudyal 	
 Dupcherla
 Erlapally 	
 Erpumalla 	
 Gouraram 	
 Hakimpeta 
 Janakampally	
 Kothur 	
 Lagcherla 	
 Lingampalle 	
 Madanapally
 Mahanthipur 	
 Metlakunta 	
 Nagereddipalle 	
 Namdapur 	
 Polepalle 	
 Regadimailwar 	
 Salimdapur 	
 Thunkumetla
 Wadcherla 	
 Yenkepally
Suryanaik tanda

Mandals in Vikarabad district